Holmesville is a suburb of Newcastle, New South Wales, Australia,  from Newcastle's central business district and close to the Sydney-Newcastle Freeway. It is part of the City of Lake Macquarie local government area.

Holmesville is the home town of Miss Universe 2004, Jennifer Hawkins.

History 
The local Aboriginal people, the Awabakal, were the first people of this land.

References

External links
 History of Holmesville (Lake Macquarie City Library)

Suburbs of Lake Macquarie